The Flevopolder is an island polder forming the bulk of Flevoland, a province of the Netherlands. Created by land reclamation, its northeastern part was drained in 1955 and the remainder—the southwest—in 1968.

Boundaries
Unlike other major polders, such as Noordoostpolder and Wieringermeer, the Flevopolder is surrounded by bordering lakes or below-sea-level channels. These are the IJsselmeer, the Veluwemeer, Ketelmeer, and Gooimeer. By some definitions, it is the largest artificial island in the world.

History

Reclamation of its land
Levees and dikes were first built around the polder. However, unlike similar projects, the internal water was then drained by diesel and electric pumps.

Etymology
Its name refers to the ancient Lake Flevo.

Geography

The Flevopolder together with the Noordoostpolder forms the province of Flevoland, the most recent province to be added to the Netherlands. Its southwestern point is close to Amsterdam and its opposite end is close to Kampen, Overijssel. It has three highly dominant settlements in terms of distribution of population.

Footnotes

References

Artificial islands of the Netherlands
Regions of Flevoland
Regions of the Netherlands
Polders of Flevoland